On the evening of August 27, 2019, a fire started in a nightclub in Coatzacoalcos, Veracruz, Mexico. The fire killed 31 people. It was started by what are believed to be members of the Jalisco New Generation Cartel, who blocked its exits.

Attack 
It is believed that unidentified members of the Jalisco drug cartel were angered at the bar owner's refusal to pay extortion demands, and burst into the bar at gunpoint. The unknown assailants then locked the doors and other emergency exits of the club and then doused the building with gasoline and set it on fire. Prior to the attack the owner was kidnapped by the same group of individuals.

Early reports of the attacks claimed that the fire had been started by homemade bombs, although it was later recanted.

Victims 
Thirty-one people were killed in the attack. Around 24 people died during the initial fire attack and seven more died later in the hospital. Of those dead, there were ten women and sixteen men. Most of those that were killed were Mexican nationals, however two of the deceased victims were Filipino sailors on shore leave.

Response 
Mexico's President Andrés Manuel López Obrador stated that the attack "degrades us as a society, as a government, as a nation." The Governor of Veracruz, Cuitláhuac García Jiménez used Twitter to condemn the attack.

Many were quick to point to the resemblance of a fire started by Los Zetas drug cartel at a casino eight years prior, which killed 52 people in Monterrey, Mexico.

References 

2019 fires in North America
2019 murders in Mexico
21st-century mass murder in Mexico
Arson in Mexico
Arson in the 2010s
Attacks on buildings and structures in Mexico
Attacks on nightclubs
August 2019 crimes in North America
August 2019 events in Mexico
History of Veracruz
Mass murder in 2019
Urban fires in North America
Violent non-state actor incidents in Mexico
Fire disasters involving barricaded escape routes
Attacks in Mexico in 2019